The following is a partial list of Snipe fleets. Fleets are the basic organizational structure of the Snipe class, a 2-person, one design racing dinghy governed by the Snipe Class International Racing Association (SCIRA), and recognized by the International Sailing Federation as an International Class. The Association consists of sailors organized into Fleets.

The first fleet outside the United States was chartered to the fleet of the Royal Cinque Ports Yacht Club, with fleet number 8. In July 1936, the Class became the world’s largest racing class, and as of May 2019, 904 chartered fleet numbers have been issued. Part of those fleets have gone inactive over the years.

List of fleets

References

External links 
Fleets of USA
Fleets of Sweden
Locale flåter Fleets of Norway
Fleets of Denmark
Fleets and fleet captains of Italy
Flotilhas Fleets of Brazil

Sailing-related lists